James Cargill or variant may refer to:

 Jimmy Cargill or James Cargill (1914–1939), Scottish soccer player
 James Cargill (musician), UK bass guitarist for Birmingham rock band Broadcast (band)
 James Ray Cargill I (1923–2006), U.S. businessman
 James Ray Cargill II (born 1949), U.S. businessman

See also

 James (disambiguation)
 Cargill (disambiguation)